Eudexia is a genus of parasitic flies in the family Tachinidae.

Species
Eudexia dreisbachi Reinhard, 1956
Eudexia formidabilis (Bigot, 1889)
Eudexia obscura (Bigot, 1889)

References

Dexiinae
Taxa named by Friedrich Moritz Brauer
Taxa named by Julius von Bergenstamm
Tachinidae genera
Diptera of North America